Manchester United Europe developed by Krisalis Software is the follow-up to the 1990 video game Manchester United which had sold over 100,000 copies. The Atari Lynx port was released under the title of European Soccer Challenge.

Gameplay 
In Manchester United Europe, the player guides either Manchester United or another club through the UEFA Cup, European Cup, Cup Winners Cup, Super Cup and the Intercontinental Cup.

Development
Computer and Video Games magazine reported in its supplement Hand-Held Go! in May 1992 that Krysalis were developing an Atari Lynx version of the game. They released this version under the title European Soccer Challenge.

Release 
The Atari Lynx version of the game (European Soccer Challenge) was being converted and planned to be published by Telegames for the Atari Jaguar and was first announced in 1994, with plans to be released later in the year but was rescheduled to be published around the second quarter of 1995, however, this port was never released for unknown reasons.

Reception
Computer and Video Games magazine reviewed the game for the Amiga in their August 1991 issue giving it a score of 84 out of 100. The Atari Lynx port was reviewed by Robert A Jung which was published to IGN Entertainment. In his final verdict he wrote that "European Soccer Challenge is a very respectable version of the popular sport. The sophisticated gameplay, quality design, and crisp controls are complemented by some very elegant graphics. Non-soccer fans won't be swayed, but enthusiasts will find this title very enjoyable." Then giving the game a score of 8 out of 10.

References

1991 video games
Acorn Archimedes games
Amiga games
Association football video games
Atari Lynx games
Atari ST games
Cancelled Atari Jaguar games
Commodore 64 games
DOS games
Krisalis Software games
Telegames games
Manchester United F.C. media
Video games developed in the United Kingdom
Video games scored by Matt Furniss
ZX Spectrum games
Multiplayer and single-player video games